Copper Mountain is a mountain and ski resort located in Summit County, Colorado, about  west of Denver on Interstate 70. The resort has  of in-bounds terrain under lease from the U.S. Forest Service, White River National Forest, Dillon Ranger District. It is operated by POWDR.

History
The resort opened in November 1972. The mountain has been operated by several owners. In 1980, it was acquired by Apex Oil Company, who operated the area until 1988, when it was acquired by the Toronto-based Horsham Corporation. In 1997, it was acquired by Intrawest, owner and operator of Whistler and operator of Winter Park. Then, in December 2009, Interwest sold Copper Mountain's operations to POWDR.

Copper Mountain hosted the World Cup tour in 1976 with four alpine ski races: slalom and giant slalom for both men and women. Copper was a late-season replacement for Heavenly Valley in California, which was low on snow. Rosi Mittermaier of West Germany won both women's races and wrapped up the 1976 overall and slalom titles, and Copper named Rosi's Run after her that same weekend.

The mountain is the starting point of the Colorado's Copper Triangle, a road-cycling circuit that has been the home of the annual Colorado Cyclist Copper Triangle Alpine Cycling Classic since 2005. This event benefits the Davis Phinney Foundation.

Copper Mountain received its first detachable chairlift in 1986 when Poma constructed the American Flyer lift, a high speed quad running from Center Village to the summit of the I-lift. It received a companion lift in 1989 when Poma constructed the American Eagle lift, replacing the F-lift from Center Village to Solitude Station. The F-lift would later reappear at Big Sky Resort as the Southern Comfort lift, and now operates on Lone Peak as the Dakota lift.

The resort's third high speed quad came in 1994, when Doppelmayr USA constructed the Timberline Express to replace the I and J double chairlifts, servicing a pod of blue trails west of the American Flyer lift. The I and J lifts were reinstalled in 1995 and 1996 to provide lift service in the Copper Bowl area, as the Mountain Chief and Blackjack lifts.

In 1998, Poma returned to construct two detachable chairlifts for the east mountain. The Super Bee, a high speed six pack, replaced the B-1 and B-2 double chairlifts, providing a one-seat ride from East Village to Resolution Bowl. A short high speed quad known as Excelerator was also built replace the E-lift triple chairlift, running from Solitude Station to the top of Super Bee.

In February 2009, Woodward Camp opened a  indoor ski and snowboard training facility dedicated to terrain park and half-pipe training.

For the 2011–2012 season, Copper Mountain installed their fifth high speed quad when Doppelmayr constructed the Union Creek lift, replacing the High Point double chairlift out of Union Creek base area. The lift was later renamed the Woodward Express in 2019 to reflect the terrain park it services. Also beginning with the 2011–2012 season, the resort became an official U.S. Ski Team downhill training venue.

For the 2017–2018 season, Doppelmayr constructed another high speed quad in the Union Creek base area. The Kokomo Express was built to replace the aging Kokomo triple chairlift and provide improved access to beginner terrain. In that same year, a mountain coaster was built in the Center Village adjacent to the lower section of the American Flyer.

During the summer of 2018, the Center Village high speed quads, now approaching 32 years of service, were replaced with new high speed six packs built by Leitner-Poma. The American Flyer was replaced with a bubble high speed six pack, which at 9,886 feet in length is the longest bubble chairlift in the world. The American Eagle was replaced with a chondola, combining high speed six pack chairs with eight passenger gondola cabins. The opening of both lifts was delayed by various technical complications and issues, including one gondola cabin falling off American Eagle due to a grip failure.

For the 2019 season, Leitner-Poma constructed a triple chairlift running from the bottom of Blackjack to the summit of Tucker Mountain. Named Three Bears, the lift services expert-only terrain previously only available by hiking or a weather-permitting snowcat ride available for a few hours a day on weekends. Also in 2019, additional towers were added to the American Flyer to combat areas of heavy sag on the uphill line.

Location
Nearby resorts within Summit County include Breckenridge, Keystone, and Arapahoe Basin, all just west of the Continental Divide and past the Eisenhower Tunnel on the way from Denver.

The Eagles Nest Wilderness is immediately north of Copper Mountain. Across I-70 are the Gore Range Trail and Wheeler Lakes Trail. The North Tenmile Creek Trail and Meadow Creek Trail descend into Frisco from the Gore Range Trail.

Resort

The lodging, dining, and entertainment facilities at Copper Mountain are divided into three villages: East Village, The Village at Copper (AKA Center Village), and West Village (formerly Union Creek).
The ski area is most notable as being designated by the National Forest Service as having the most organized skier layout of any ski resort. The beginner runs are located entirely to the west and graduate evenly in difficulty as the lifts progress to the east. They are isolated from the busier and more difficult runs in a natural fashion. Similarly, the intermediate runs are located even more to the east and develop in difficulty in a smooth manner. More difficult runs are to the far east, with the most difficult runs being on the backside. The most southern Tucker Mountain provides only double black diamond runs.

Olympic medalist Putzi Frandl worked at Copper Mountain as a ski instructor for many years beginning in 1984.

Statistics

Elevation
 Summit: 
 Base: 
 Vertical:

Slope Aspects
 North: 55%
 South: 5%
 East: 25%
 West: 15%

Trails
 Trails: 150 total (25% beginner, 24% intermediate, 34% advanced, 17% expert)
 Acres: 
 Average annual snowfall: 
 Snowmaking 05/06 : 
 Bowls: 5 (Resolution, Spaulding, Copper, Jupiter, Union)
 Peaks: 3 (Copper, Tucker, Union)

Lifts
 25 total
 3 high speed six pack chairlifts:
1 chondola (Six-passenger chairs/Eight-passenger Gondola cabins): American Eagle
1 bubble high speed six pack: American Flyer
1 non-bubble high speed six pack: Super Bee
 4 high-speed quad chairlifts: Excelerator, Timberline Express, Kokomo Express, Woodward Express
 5 triple chairlifts: Lumberjack, Resolution, Rendezvous, Sierra, Three Bears
 4 double chairlifts: Alpine, Pitchfork, Blackjack, Mountain Chief
 1 T-Bar: Storm King
 2 Single Surface Tow Lifts: Celebrity Ridge, Gem
 6 Conveyor Lifts

In popular culture
The resort was the central location for the 1983 film Copper Mountain.

The ski scenes in the 1994 film Dumb and Dumber were filmed at Copper. The chairlift used was the E-Chair, which has since been replaced by the Excelerator High Speed Quad.

References

External links

 

Buildings and structures in Summit County, Colorado
Geography of Summit County, Colorado
Landforms of Summit County, Colorado
Ski areas and resorts in Colorado
Tourist attractions in Summit County, Colorado
White River National Forest